Petar Hristov (born 25 June 1999) is a Bulgarian footballer who currently plays as a forward for FC Krumovgrad.

On 9 September 2017, Hristov scored his first senior goal for Pirin in a 5–0 win against Lokomotiv Plovdiv.

References

External links

Living people
1999 births
Sportspeople from Blagoevgrad
Bulgarian footballers
Bulgaria youth international footballers
Association football forwards
First Professional Football League (Bulgaria) players
Second Professional Football League (Bulgaria) players
OFC Pirin Blagoevgrad players
FC Arda Kardzhali players
PFC Litex Lovech players
FC Krumovgrad players